Albek Musayevich Gongapshev (born 19 April 2000) is a Russian football player who plays for FC SKA-Khabarovsk.

Club career
He made his debut in the Russian Professional Football League for PFC Spartak Nalchik on 23 March 2019 in a game against FC Krasnodar-3.

He made his Russian Football National League debut for FC Shinnik Yaroslavl on 28 July 2019 in a game against FC Luch Vladivostok.

References

External links
 Profile by Russian Professional Football League
 

2000 births
Sportspeople from Nalchik
Living people
Russian footballers
Association football forwards
PFC Spartak Nalchik players
FC Shinnik Yaroslavl players
FC SKA-Khabarovsk players
Russian First League players
Russian Second League players